Snowdrift is a 1923 American action film directed by Scott R. Dunlap and written by John Stone. It is based on the 1922 novel Snowdrift by James Hendryx. The film stars Buck Jones, Bert Sprotte, Gertrude Ryan, Colin Chase, Evelyn Selbie and Annette Jean. The film was released on April 22, 1923, by Fox Film Corporation.

Cast             
Buck Jones as Carter Brent 
Bert Sprotte as Jean McLaire 
Gertrude Ryan as Margot McFarlane 
Colin Chase as Murdo McFarlane 
Evelyn Selbie as Wananebish 
Annette Jean as Little Jean
Irene Rich as Kitty
G. Raymond Nye as Johnnie Claw 
Dorothy Manners as Snowdrift
Lalo Encinas as Joe Pete
Lee Shumway as John Reeves
C.E. Anderson as Trapper

References

External links
 

1923 films
American action films
1920s action films
Fox Film films
Films directed by Scott R. Dunlap
American silent feature films
American black-and-white films
1920s English-language films
1920s American films